Miroslav Milošević (Serbian Cyrillic: Мирослав Милошевић; born 2 July 1975) is a Serbian footballer.

External links
 Profile and stats at Srbijafudbal
 Profile and stats until 2003 at Dekisa.Tripod

1975 births
Living people
Serbian footballers
Serbian expatriate footballers
FK Napredak Kruševac players
FK Milicionar players
FK Hajduk Beograd players
FK Pelister players
FK Makedonija Gjorče Petrov players
FK Rabotnički players
Expatriate footballers in North Macedonia
Expatriate footballers in Austria
Association football midfielders
FK Horizont Turnovo players